Francis Spaight was a transport ship in the 19th century, owned by an Irish merchant from Limerick, Ireland. The ship was engaged in trade with North America, such as transporting Irish emigrants to North America and transporting timber on the return trip. Francis Spaight became infamous for an incident of cannibalism.

Final voyage
On December 3, 1835, the ship broached to off the coast of Canada in a snow storm, washing away all the provisions and fouling the water stores. Of the 18 crewmen, three were thrown overboard during the accident and 15 survived, including four young crewmen in their teens.

With only rain water and bottles of wine, the crewmen endured severe cold, dehydration and hunger until December 18, when the captain suggested they sacrifice one of the four young crewmen to survive. The captain justified exclusion of other older crewmen by the fact that they had families depending on them. The four boys cast lots and Patrick O'Brien, a fifteen-year-old cabin boy, drew the death lot. Captain ordered the cook to kill O'Brien; the cook initially refused but was later forced to do so by the captain. However, the cook failed in killing O'Brien. O'Brien attempted to kill himself by cutting his own wrist, but his attempt also failed. In the end, the captain resorted to cutting O'Brien's throat, at which point O'Brien resisted but was killed. The surviving crewmen cannibalised O'Brien for three days until the 20th, when an adult crewman, Michael Behane, and another cabin boy, George Burns, became deranged from dehydration and hunger. They were also cannibalised, in addition to another crewman who died on the same day.

When the surviving crewmen were about to draw another lot for cannibalism, they were spotted by the American vessel Agenoria. The crewmen were waving hands and feet of cannibalised victims to express their plight. After being stranded for twenty days, 11 crewmen survived out of 18. Three died due to the snow storm, and four had been cannibalised. Aboard the Agenoria, the survivors were so emaciated and malnourished that they couldn't feed themselves without help.

See also
 Custom of the sea

References

Sources

Citations

Incidents of cannibalism
Maritime incidents in December 1836
Age of Sail merchant ships